The Kingsgate Centre is an indoor shopping centre located in the town centre of Dunfermline, Fife, Scotland. Marks and Spencer and the former Debenhams store anchors the main entrances to the shopping centre. The Kingsgate was extended in 2008 at which time it also underwent significant refurbishment. The centre has a three-storey car park on the roof and contains 74 retail units over two floors.

References

External links 
 Kingsgate Official Website

Shopping centres in Fife
Buildings and structures in Dunfermline
1985 establishments in Scotland
Shopping malls established in 1985